Khan-Uul Club is a Mongolian football club, competing in the Mongolia First League.

Futsal

In addition to field football, in which the team played for Mongolia First League in the 2020 season and ended up being relegated to Mongolia Second League, the club also maintains a futsal team and disputes, in 2020, the Mongolian Futsal Premier League.

References

Football clubs in Mongolia